Filip Hološko (born 17 January 1984) is a Slovak former professional footballer who played as a forward or winger.

Club career

Beşiktaş
At the mid of 2007–08 season, he was transferred to Beşiktaş JK in exchange of the forward Burak Yılmaz (a promising youngster at the time) along with veteran defender Koray Avcı plus a considerable sum of €5 million. Regarding the huge amount paid, and two first team regulars given to an exchange deal, both Yıldırım Demirören and the Beşiktaş board were severely criticized by media pundits. However, Hološko managed to blend in after a brief period of time and embarrassed many, with his miraculous performance during the 2008–09 season. Hološko is also well known for his goal against Fenerbahce in the second half of the season; he took the ball from his own half and later he ran through five Fenerbahce players and scored. He also scored a goal in the Turkish Cup Final in İzmir Atatürk Stadium vs Fenerbahce, with a final score of 4–2 to the Black Eagles.

After a prominently successful season, Hološko had to struggle with a heavy injury on his splint bone, which occurred in the CSKA Moscow-Besiktas Champions League game (the outcome of which was a 2–1 defeat to Besiktas). At the end of the first half of the 2009–10 season he had only made five league appearances, scoring just a single goal. On 2 December 2010, he scored Beşiktaş' 100th goal in UEFA Cup Competitions vs CSKA Sofia.

Sydney FC
On 20 July 2015, Sydney FC announced that it had signed Hološko as the club's international marquee on a two-year deal.

Whilst Sydney struggled in 2015–16, Hološko was a highlight and a fan favourite. His work ethic, speed, and goal scoring ability was much appreciated by the Sydney faithful.

In 2016–17, Hološko teamed up yet again with Bobô, proving clinical together in the A-League, scoring 22 goals between them and several assists.

On 8 October 2016, Hološko scored Sydney FC's first goal of the A-League campaign, in a 4–0 rout of local rivals Western Sydney Wanderers in the Sydney Derby, and scored a brace the following week against Central Coast Mariners in another 4–0 win.

Hološko finished the 2016–17 A-League regular season on seven goals, and eight assists as Sydney FC won the Premiership with a record number of points. He scored in the Sky Blues' 3–0 semifinal win over Perth Glory, edging him to 5th place on Sydney FC's all time goalscorers list.

On 22 May 2017, Sydney FC announced that Hološko's contract would not be renewed, and that he had returned to Europe.

International career
Hološko came to international attention playing for the Slovakia Under-20 team in the 2003 FIFA World Youth Championship. On 3 September 2010, Hološko scored a last-minute goal against Macedonia after a Marek Hamšík assist to help provide a winning start to Slovakia's Euro 2012 qualification campaign.

Personal life
Hološko is married with Adelka, who gave birth to a girl, named Sophie, in May 2009.

In August 2010, they had another daughter named Claudia.

Career statistics

Club

International

Scores and results list Slovakia's goal tally first, score column indicates score after each Hološko goal.

Honours
Beşiktaş
 Turkish Super League: 2008–09
 Turkish Cup: 2008–09

İstanbul Başakşehir
 Turkish Cup: runner-up 2010–11

Sydney FC
A-League Premiership: 2016–17
A-League Championship: 2016–17

Slovakia U19
 UEFA European Under-19 Championship: third place 2002

References

External links

 
 TFF
 
 

1984 births
Living people
Sportspeople from Piešťany
Slovak footballers
Association football forwards
Slovakia international footballers
Slovakia youth international footballers
2010 FIFA World Cup players
Slovak Super Liga players
Czech First League players
Süper Lig players
A-League Men players
Marquee players (A-League Men)
AS Trenčín players
FC Slovan Liberec players
Manisaspor footballers
Beşiktaş J.K. footballers
İstanbul Başakşehir F.K. players
Çaykur Rizespor footballers
Sydney FC players
ŠK Slovan Bratislava players
1. FC Slovácko players
Slovak expatriate footballers
Slovak expatriate sportspeople in Turkey
Expatriate footballers in Turkey
Slovak expatriate sportspeople in the Czech Republic
Expatriate footballers in the Czech Republic
Slovak expatriate sportspeople in Australia
Expatriate soccer players in Australia